Blue Mountain is a mountain in the Crystal Range, a subrange of the Sierra Nevada. It is west of Lake Tahoe on the western boundary of the Desolation Wilderness in El Dorado County, California.

See also
 Eldorado National Forest

References

Mountains of the Desolation Wilderness
Mountains of El Dorado County, California
Mountains of Northern California